Battery D, 1st Battalion Tennessee Light Artillery was an artillery battery that served in the Union Army during the American Civil War.

Service
The battalion was organized in Memphis, Nashville, and Knoxville, Tennessee, from June 13, 1863, through October 16, 1863, under the command of Lieutenant Colonel Robert Clay Crawford.  Battery D was recruited in Anderson County, Tennessee and mustered in at Knoxville for three years service on September 18, 1863, under the command of Captain David K. Young.

Battery D was attached to Post and District of Nashville, Department of the Cumberland, to March 1865. 3rd Brigade, 4th Division, District of East Tennessee, Department of the Cumberland, to July 1865.

Battery D, 1st Battalion Tennessee Light Artillery mustered out of service at Nashville on July 20, 1865.

Detailed service
Served as garrison artillery at Nashville during its entire term of service. Battle of Nashville December 15–16, 1864.

Commanders
 Captain David K. Young
 Captain Samuel D. Leinart

See also

 List of Tennessee Civil War units
 Tennessee in the Civil War

References
 Dyer, Frederick H.  A Compendium of the War of the Rebellion (Des Moines, IA:  Dyer Pub. Co.), 1908.
Attribution

External links
 Brief unit history, including officers' names, regimental strengths, etc.

Military units and formations established in 1863
Military units and formations disestablished in 1865
Units and formations of the Union Army from Tennessee
1865 disestablishments in Tennessee
1863 establishments in Tennessee
Artillery units and formations of the American Civil War